Abbas Ali Atwi (born 15 December 1984), also known as Onika (also spelled Unica), is a Lebanese football coach and former player who is team manager of  club Bourj.

Club career 
Atwi joined Bourj's youth team aged 14; he made his senior debut in the Lebanese Second Division in 2000, in a 4–3 defeat against Ahed. Atwi moved to Lebanese Premier League side Olympic Beirut in 2002, with whom he won the domestic double (league and cup) in his first season.

In 2005 Atwi signed for Ahed. He scored 58 league goals and won five league titles in 12 years at the club.

Atwi joined Ansar in 2017, helping them win their first league title in 14 years in 2021.

On 18 June 2021, Atwi moved back to Bourj, where he had begun his career. He announced his retirement on 20 May 2022, following the 2021–22 season.

International career 

In 2005, Atwi played for the Lebanon national under-23 team; he scored from the half-way line in a game against Japan U23, which Lebanon lost 2–1.

Atwi has played for the Lebanon national team between 2002 and 2016, scoring four goals in over 50 appearances. He has played at the 2006, 2010, 2014, and 2018 FIFA World Cup qualifiers, and the 2004 and 2015 AFC Asian Cup qualifiers, as well as at the 2002 and 2004 WAFF Championships and at the 2002 Arab Cup.

Personal life 
Atwi earned his nickname "Onika" in reference to the Lebanese chocolate bar Unica as, after being involved in a non-fatal car accident as a kid, the first thing he asked his mother was the chocolate bar that he was holding in his hand during the accident.

He is not related to fellow Lebanese footballer Abbas Ahmad Atwi.

Career statistics

International
Scores and results list Lebanon's goal tally first, score column indicates score after each Atwi goal.

Honours 
Bourj
 Lebanese Challenge Cup: 2021
 Lebanese Second Division: 2000–01

Olympic Beirut
 Lebanese Premier League: 2002–03
 Lebanese FA Cup: 2002–03

Ahed
 Lebanese Premier League: 2007–08, 2009–10, 2010–11, 2014–15, 2016–17
 Lebanese FA Cup: 2008–09, 2010–11
 Lebanese Elite Cup: 2008, 2010, 2011, 2013, 2015

 Lebanese Super Cup: 2008, 2010, 2011, 2015
Ansar
 Lebanese Premier League: 2020–21
 Lebanese FA Cup: 2020–21

Individual
 Lebanese Premier League Best Player: 2002–03
 Lebanese Premier League Best Young Player: 2001–02
 Lebanese Premier League Team of the Season: 2002–03, 2005–06, 2007–08, 2009–10, 2010–11, 2012–13, 2014–15, 2015–16, 2018–19
 Lebanese Premier League top assist provider: 2007–08, 2009–10

See also 
 List of Lebanon international footballers

References

External links

 
 Abbas Ali Atwi at RSSSF
 
 
 

1984 births
Living people
People from Marjeyoun District
Lebanese footballers
Association football forwards
Bourj FC players
Olympic Beirut players
Al Ahed FC players
Al Ansar FC players
Lebanese Second Division players
Lebanese Premier League players
Lebanon youth international footballers
Lebanon international footballers